Charles Ulysses DeBerry (April 21, 1910 – October 11, 1969) was an American football coach. He served as the head football coach at North Carolina A&T University from 1942 to 1944, compiling a record of 10–11. DeBerry was later the chair of the physical education department at Winston-Salem State University.

DeBerry attended North Carolina A&T he participated in four varsity sports: football, basketball, baseball, and track. He died on October 11, 1969, at L. Richardson in Greensboro, North Carolina, following a short illness.

Head coaching record

References

1910 births
1969 deaths
North Carolina A&T Aggies baseball players
North Carolina A&T Aggies football coaches
North Carolina A&T Aggies football players
North Carolina A&T Aggies men's basketball players
North Carolina A&T Aggies men's track and field athletes
Winston-Salem State University faculty
Baseball players from Greensboro, North Carolina
Players of American football from Greensboro, North Carolina
Basketball players from Greensboro, North Carolina
Sportspeople from Greensboro, North Carolina
African-American coaches of American football
African-American players of American football
African-American baseball players
African-American basketball players
African-American male track and field athletes
20th-century African-American sportspeople